Meridian may refer to:

Meridian, Logan County, Oklahoma, town
Meridian, Stephens County, Oklahoma, CDP

See also
 Indian meridian, governs the surveys in Oklahoma east of 100° west longitude (non-panhandle)
 Cimarron meridian, governs the surveys in Oklahoma west of 100° west longitude (panhandle)